Jack Feldstein is an animator and screenwriter from Sydney, Australia, now living in New York. He is the pioneer of Neon Films and a prize-winning playwright. Feldstein's quote to do with scriptwriting is "The scriptwriter lives the life of the safe passive gatherer but possesses the dangerous inner terrain of an active hunter".

His trademark style is the "neonizing" of a combination of live-action video recording and public domain material, particularly cartoons.  "Neonizing" is a complex computer technique that renders the lines of an image to be like a neon sign.

Early life and education
Jack was born in Adelaide to Mark and Victoria (née Freyer) Feldstein, French-speaking Ashkenazi Jews who were born in Egypt and had emigrated to Adelaide, Australia.  He left Adelaide for university in Sydney where he studied at the National Institute of Dramatic Art (NIDA) course in playwriting and graduated from the Australian Film, Television and Radio School (AFTRS) in scriptwriting in 1992. Before that he obtained a degree in pharmacy from the University of Sydney.

Career
Feldstein was a scriptwriter for many years before, as he puts it, he woke up one morning and began making neon films. In the 1990s he was instrumental in developing series for Australian television. He then went on to be Head Writer for Brilliant Digital Entertainment where he was involved in creating 3D computer animated multipath webisode series which included Xena-Warrior Princess, Superman and Ace Ventura.

Neon animation
He describes neon animation (neonism) as a deconstructionist, post-modern animation filmmaking style that utilizes appropriation and pop art techniques in a "Warhol meets Vegas" look.  It is a stream-of-consciousness narrative with a cartoon aesthetic that takes modernist stream-of-consciousness filmmaking into a post-modern and humorous form.

Neon animation has also been described as re-animation and as metempsychotic (reincarnated) modernism. The rambling, seemingly make-it-up-as-you-go-along, stream of consciousness ironic monologue narratives have been likened to an Australian twist on Woody Allen and Spalding Gray.

Narratives
Recently, Feldstein completed a six-part series called "The Adventures of..." in which he continued the ironic exploration of his theme of rescuing great literary characters such as Oedipus Rex and Gregor Samsa and playfully interfering in the lives of modernist writers like Virginia Woolf, James Joyce, Marcel Proust, JD Salinger and Jack Kerouac.

He also has released two narrative documentary neon animations: The Fantastical World of Scriptwriting and The Psychology of Scriptwriting.

As an active participant and supporter of the Kino movement in Sydney, Australia, Jack used to often screen his neon animations at their monthly events.

Current work

Currently, Jack is the Director of Outreach and Filmmaker Liaison for Chain Theatre on W36th St., in Manhattan.

In July 2021, Feldstein was the recipient of a City Artist Corps Grant from the City of New York for his Animated New Yorkers series, in which he interviews and then animates 10 New York artists.

In December 2021, The Queensland Museum of Modern Art's cinematheque included Feldstein's 2005 neon animation The Great Oz Love Yarn in their retrospective of Australian animators and animations from the 1970s onwards.

In 2022, Feldstein completed a neon animation adaptation of "Isaac B. Singer Shows and Tells" which currently streams on ChaiFlicks. Feldstein has also completed versions of HP Lovecraft's tales "Ex Oblivione" and "Memory".  He is planning to create a third neon animation in his scriptwriting trilogy, which will be called "Confessions of a Scriptwriter". In collaboration with New York-based actor, Shane Baker he developed the neon animation " How to Break into Yiddish Vaudeville". "How to Break into Yiddish Vaudeville" had its world premiere in January 2015 in the Walter Reade Theater at Lincoln Center as part of the 2015 New York Jewish Film Festival.  Feldstein also created a neon animation with Shane Baker, who recited Peretz Markish's Yiddish poem Brokshtiker (Shards) for the 60-year commemoration of the Night of the Murdered Poets in August 2012. This premiered at the New York Jewish Film Festival 2013, Walter Reade theater at the Lincoln Center, on 10 January 2013.

In June 2015, he completed a neon animation called "Plain Talk", collaborating with Deborah Starr, a graduate of the Narrative Medicine department at Columbia University.  Feldstein intends to continue this series of neon animations combining medical issues and neon animation.

"You Might be the One" a song by Botanica, the New York-based band, is Feldstein's most recent music video neon animation.

He also completed neon animations to various New York spoken-word poets including one of Walt Whitman's poems "Manahatta" performed by poet, George Wallace, the writer in residence at the Walt Whitman Birthplace, Huntington, New York. The "Manahatta" neon animation screened at the Angelika Film Center in New York City for two weeks and its European premiere was at the Zebra Poetry Film Festival in Berlin in October 2012. As part of Curate NYC 2013, an open artworks competition that received over 1900 submissions from New York-based artists, "Manahatta" was selected by Jan Seidler Ramirez, Chief Curator & Director of Collections, National September 11 Memorial & Museum in Lower Manhattan. It was on display at the newly refurbished Queens Museum of Art as part of the Arts Commons. "Manahatta" screened at the New York Transit Museum in Brooklyn in April 2014 as part of their Platform Series. Jack was series coordinator for The Subway Poetry Film series featuring six films by New York filmmakers interpreting six poems on the subject of the New York City Subway.  Feldstein's neon animation contribution is to the poem "Subway Services" by Philip Dacey. The Subway Film Series premiered at the Queens World Film Festival, New York on 4 March 2012, and amongst many other venues and colleges around New York City. The Subway Film Series screened at the Queens Museum of Art for their "A Frame Apart 2" program.

On 14 May 2011, a retrospective of Feldstein's neon animation films was screened as part of the Personal Cinema Series at Millennium Film Workshop in downtown Manhattan and subsequently at the Filmwax Film Series in Brooklyn, NY.

During 2011, Jack was the art/film editor for "Unlikely Stories" an online US literary publication for poetry, film, art and essays.

For New York Fashion Week 2011, Feldstein co-directed with top New York designer, Norma Kamali, the 3D Fashion Film presenting the Norma Kamali Spring Collection 2012. The film was premiered at Lincoln Center, 14 September 2011. Included in the 3D film is Feldstein's first foray in 3D neon animation. It was nominated for "Best Online Fashion Video" at the 2012 New York Fashion Awards 2.0. Jack continues to work with Kamali on 3D Fashion films and various other projects. For New York Fashion Week Fall/Winter 2012, Feldstein helped Kamali create two 3D fashion films launching her collections.

Feldstein was also involved in creating neon animations for the production of In Masks Outrageous and Austere, Tennessee Williams' last and unseen full-length play which had its world premiere at the 45 Bleecker Street Theatre, New York in April 2012.

In 2018, Jack Feldstein was director of animation and his neon animation was featured in David Leigh Abts' documentary "BODEGA?" which explores the bodegas and characters of New York City with music by the Dandy Warhols.

Love and Sex Between Prime Numbers, a feature film script by Feldstein is currently being developed by Spotted Turquoise Films.

As part of the Dream Up Festival August 2013 at the downtown Theater for the New City, Feldstein's monologue about a young woman on a bender, "The Bender" is part of the Grand Guignol Danse Macabre series of plays. In October 2013, "The Bender" was also be performed around New York City including at the Bronx Museum of the Arts.

A production of Jack's play with songs by Melanie Safka, "Three Months with Pook," was mounted at Dixon Place in Lower Manhattan in July 2014. "Three Months with Pook" was again invited to be performed at Dixon Place in February 2015. "Three Months with Pook" was a winner in the TRU, (Theater Producers Organization based in New York) play competition in summer 2019. The play with songs, based on his neon animation of the same name, deals with issues of sexual fluidity and abuse in a humorous way.

Feldstein was a member of Workshop Theater Company at 312 West 36th Street in Manhattan and developed some of his scripts and musicals there. "Une Parisienne in New York", one of his latest work with 14 songs in English and French by songwriter Greta Gertler, is one of these projects. "Une Parisienne in New York" was presented at Dixon Place in February 2018. Another is "The Kingdom of Vincent Grapelli" with singer/songwriter Rivky Grossman.  In March 2015, his play "Happy Chrismukkah", about a stressed out New York couple dreaming of escaping to Australia, was a winner in the NYC Playwrights "Save the Rom-Com" competition. A workshop of Your YouTuber a monologue written by Feldstein and performed by Ty Baumann was presented in May 2016 for the Flying Solo Theater Festival at the Secret Theater, LIC, New York. Subsequently, Your YouTuber won the Elite Theatre Company 8th Annual One Act Play Competition. And was mounted in January 2017 in California. Also in January 2017, at Workshop Theater, "The Man Who Made New York" a full-length play by Feldstein about Robert Moses, NYC's master-builder, was first presented.  The play was directed by Robert Kalfin.

In Fall 2018, Jack Feldstein began a residency at Sitting Shotgun Theatre in Williamsburg, Brooklyn where with Annemarie Hagenaars he developed his next project Carnival of Souls: Neon Animation plus Live Theatre which launched at Dixon Place in NYC on 12 October 2018. With this project, Feldstein combined his two loves, neon animation and live theater. In 2019, this work was selected to be mounted at the New York Fringe Festival in the Chain Theatre, midtown Manhattan.

In November 2019, Feldstein's play The Sparkling City of Omar Mazen was selected by the Blank Theatre Company in Los Angeles, for their Living Room Series. The work deals with immigrants in small-town Australia. The play was directed by Mousa Kraish

"The Guru of Ozone Park," Feldstein's play about a New York couple facing the challenges that occur after the husband suffers a spinal chord injury that renders him wheelchair-bound was selected for Healing Voices at Kean University, Premiere Stages Theatre, New Jersey in February 2021.

Feldstein has written the book and lyrics for the world's first theremin musical "Falling in Love with Dellamort" working with Dorit Chrysler, founder of the NY Theremin Society and composer Paul Doust. "Falling in Love with Mr Dellamort" had its World Premiere on 6 December 2017 at The Slipper Room in NYC. "Falling in Love with Mr. Dellamort" the audio musical was released July 23, 2021. This radio adaptation was written by Feldstein. Broadway performers James Monroe Iglehart, Courtney Reed, Lena Hall, Jackie Hoffman, Telly Leung, Gavin Lee were cast. The soundtrack was released by Broadway Records.

Festivals and honors

Feldstein's short films have been shown at film festivals around the world.  Some of these festivals and honors for his films and plays include:
IN PURSUIT OF HAPPINESS, a neon animation by Feldstein was awarded an honorable mention in the Broadway On Demand Short Film Festival in August 2021.
WHAT'S YOUR DREAM?, a film by Feldstein showing immigrant kids in Jackson Heights, NY revealing their dreams was selected for the CineMigrant Film Festival in 2020.  
Feldstein's play THE WOMEN'S FOLLOW YOUR DREAM CLUB was included in the "Best Ten Minute Plays of 2019" book published by Smith and Kraus. 
Excellence Award for Feldstein's one-act play THE CONFESSION OF PETER McDOWELL from Shakespeare in the Burg Theater Festival, Virginia in 2018. 
 Feldstein's full-length play NEIL SIMON'S LAST HIT was selected as a finalist in the 2017 Aloha Performing Arts Company original play contest. It has also been chosen as a Stage Rights Ready-to-Publish Award Finalist 2019.
 In 2016, Feldstein's play "The Doppelganger" was mounted in Seattle His The Women's Follow Your Dreams Club" was presented in Milwaukee and "Your Youtuber" performed by Ty Baumann and written and directed by Jack Feldstein took place at The Secret Theater, in LIC, NYC on 26 May.
"A Wondrous Tale about Emma Brooks," an adaptation of Feldstein's neon animation with songs by Rivky Grossman was presented at Dixon Place and also at the Duplex, NYC in 2016. Feldstein himself narrated the performances.
 Excellence Award for Feldstein's one-act play THE PROCESS in June 2016 from Shakespeare in the Burg Theater Festival, Virginia.
Providence Children's Film Festival 2015, Feldstein's neon animation "Monocular Man" based on R Jim Stahl's true story about Jimmy who loses an eye but is able to see more than most, won runner up in both the Audience Award and the Special Jury's Choice Award for best short film. "Monocular Man" also won the Jury Prize for Animation at the New England Online Film Festival which was presented at the ITVFest (Independent Television Festival) in Vermont 2015.
During 2011, Jack's full length playscript "The Ansonia" was workshopped at Broadway Theater Studio in midtown Manhattan. While in 2012, his musical play "Paradox" with music and lyrics by Drew Kresman was developed at the Workshop Theater Company on West 36th Street, Manhattan. On 22 March 2013 Paradox was presented at Dixon Place in downtown Manhattan. In September 2013, "Paradox" was broadcast as an audio radio musical for Radio Drama Revival out of Maine.
Bowery Poetry Club, NYC, screened a preview of "How to be Romantic in New York" in late 2010.
In January 2010, Feldstein's one act play, "The Great Dazzlo" was presented by the Elite Theatre Company, Oxnard, California, directed by Oscar-winner Steve Grumette. In 2017, "The Great Dazzlo" was performed at the Go-Green Playfest in Queens, NYC.
In 2009, Feldstein's full-length play "The Sparkling City of Omar Mazen" received a "commended" by that year's BBC World Service International Playwriting Competition.
In October 2009 the mini-musical "Ordinary" was staged in Short and Sweet and Song at the Pilgrim Theatre, Sydney. Feldstein wrote the book and lyrics and the music was composed by Benjamin Ward. A review by Australian Stage, 9 October 2009, said "Jack Feldstein's book & lyrics were, on the whole, sobering and inspirational. The premise, of two carnies desirous of running away from the circus, to join ordinary people was a stroke of pure, fresh, unadulterated genius." A version of "Ordinary" toured New York City libraries and other venues in May/April 2012 in a program called "One Act Gems" on a bill with plays by F. Scott Fitzgerald and Noël Coward. "Ordinary" was also as part of the Piney Fork Press Theater Festival touring New York libraries in 2013. and was presented at the Midtown International Theatre Festival 2013 short play lab. The Abingdon Theater Company in mid-Manhattan and Modern Day Griot Theatre Company in Brooklyn also presented "Ordinary" in late 2013. In 2017, "Ordinary" was presented with its songs by Benjamin P Ward at the Drama League in Tribeca and the East End Fringe Festival in Long Island, New York.
California State University, Chico campus screened "The Atomic Adventures of Jack Kerouac" as part of their Annual Narrative Shorts International Film Festival 2009.
Woodstock, New York Museum Film Festival 2009 and 2010, screened "The Fantastical World of Scriptwriting" with Feldstein presenting his seminar on scriptwriting.
 Singapore Short Film Festival (5th) premiered "Ex Oblivione" in September 2009 in competition for the International "Voice" Award, representing originality and artistic quality.
Bornshorts, the Film and Music Video Festival in Denmark premiered Feldstein's neon animation music video "Neon Walk 'round Circular Quay" set to Sydney singer-songwriter Maxine Kauter's song, "Some Perfect Day" in late August 2009.
Scinema 09 (Australian Science Film Festival) premiered "The Psychology of Scriptwriting" during its National Science Week in August 2009.  "The Psychology of Scriptwriting" was in competition for the Scinema best animation/experimental film prize.
Moves 09 (Movement On Screen) April 2009, Manchester, the largest exhibition platform for New Media in the UK, presented the world premiere of "The Fantastical World of Scriptwriting."  The 32-minute film was described as a fun, unconventional way to teach scriptwriting through educational therapy. In April 2010, "The Psychology of Scriptwriting" screened at Moves 10.
Soho Rushes Film Festival July 2008, London, UK, where "The Adventures of Virginia Woolf" was a contender for the Broadcast Design Award.
Sarasota Film Festival 2008, Florida, where "Shmetamorphosis" had its USA premiere. ShortEnd Magazine wrote that Shmetamorphosis was "Thought jarring, often visually abrasive but also intriguing in its original freakishness."
Rotterdam International Film Festival, where in 2006 "The Ecstasy of Gary Green" was chosen to compete for the Tiger Award for short film, and his film "A Wondrous Film about Emma Brooks" was selected for the 2007 program.  "Shmetamorphosis" screened in the 2008 New Arrivals Section of Rotterdam IFF. "Shmetamorphosis" had previously been selected as winner of the April 2007 online New Arrivals section of Rotterdam International Film Festival.
 Impakt Film Festival, Utrecht, The Netherlands, where in 2006 "The Ecstasy of Gary Green" screened and selected for 2007 was " A Wondrous Film about Emma Brooks." In 2009, Impakt Film Festival screened "The Fantastical World of Scriptwriting" during their Festival.
Melbourne International Animation Film Festival, where in 2006 he received an Honorable Mention for "The Ecstasy of Gary Green."
 Sydney International Film Festival where "The Loser Who Won," his neon animation about a guy who's unlucky-in-love finally finding love, which had premiered at the New York Jewish Film Festival at Lincoln Center, was screened at the Dendy Awards for 2005.  In 2007, "A Wondrous Film about Emma Brooks" was again a finalist for the Dendy Awards, Sydney Film Festival. A Sydney film reviewer wrote "Jack Feldstein is a comic genius. This neon animation samples our (Freudian) dreams, paranoias and obsessions until young Emma's coming-of-age journey becomes our own. Fantastic."
Short Fuse Film Festival, 2005, for his film "The Theft."
The Bunker International Film Festival 2007 (Italy/The Netherlands) where " A Wondrous Film about Emma Brooks" won an audience favourite prize.
Wollongong, Short-Sited Festival where in 2005 he received the Best Short Film prize (Australian National Short Film) for "The Great Oz Love Yarn."  In October 2007, "The Great Oz Love Yarn" was awarded a prize in the under 12-minute films category, at the inaugural Hawkesbury Film Festival, New South Wales, Australia.
Over The Fence Comedy Festival, where in 2005 his film "Rock Hard" won the Best Film prize.  In 2007 "The Great Oz Love Yarn" won Best Director Prize in that festival.
 The Australian Effects & Animation Festival 2002, where his film "Three Months with Pook" was awarded a Certificate of Excellence.  In 2004, "Three Months with Pook" was selected for the New Filmmakers Film Series in New York.
As a scriptwriter, in 2000, Feldstein won first prize of $5000 in the Queensland Speech and Drama Teachers' Jubilee National Playwriting Competition for his play "A House Like Any Other" about a Jewish family in a small Australian town. In 2001, his play script of "Three months with Pook", was a finalist in that year's BBC World Service/British Council International radio playwriting competition.

Selected filmography 
The Ecstasy of Gary Green
Computer Games
The Loser Who Won
Rock Hard
A Wondrous Film about Emma Brooks
The Great OZ Love Yarn
The Adventures of James Joyce

References

External links

Unofficial Website
Complete Filmography and Honors

A Wondrous Film About Emma Brooks (2007), The New York Times.
"The Montreal Jewish Film Festival: Keeping kosher", Hour Community.
Brysha, Blazenka. "Jack Feldstein Interviewed".

Year of birth missing (living people)
Writers from Sydney
Australian animators
Australian animated film directors
Jewish Australian writers
Living people
Writers from Adelaide
Australian screenwriters